Figure skating at the 1968 Winter Olympics was held at Le Stade Olympique de Glace in Grenoble, France. Ice dance, then known as "rhythmic skating," was a demonstration event and was won by the team of Diane Towler and Bernard Ford of Great Britain. It became a medal event eight years later in 1976 Innsbruck.

Medal table

Results

Men

Referee:
  Josef Dědič

Assistant Referee:
  Sonia Bianchetti

Judges:
  Martin Felsenkirch
  Ralph S. McCreath
  Emil Skákala
  Jeanine Donnier-Blanc
  Erika Schiechtl
  Geoffrey S. Yates
  Michele Beltrami
  Haruo Kanno
  Yvonne S. McGowan

Ladies

Referee:
  Karl Enderlin

Assistant Referee:
  Néri Valdes

Judges:
  Martin Felsenkirch
  Dagmar Řeháková
  Carla Listing
  János Zsigmondy
  Mollie Phillips
  Éva György
  Masao Hasegawa
  Norman E. Fuller
  Konstantin Likharev

Pairs

Referee:
  Gérard Rodrigues Henriques

Assistant Referee:
  Donald H. Gilchrist

Judges:
  Franz Wojtanowskyj
  Ralph S. McCreath
  Emil Skákala
  Monique Georgelin
  Carla Listing
  Wilhelm Kahle
  Maria Zuchowicz
  Yvonne S. McGowan
  Tatiana Tolmacheva

References

External links
 Official Olympic Report
 results

 
1968 Winter Olympics events
1968
1968 in figure skating
International figure skating competitions hosted by France